Hugh Hare (1668–1707) was an English translator and politician.

Hugh Hare may also refer to:

Hugh Hare, 1st Baron Coleraine (1606–1667), English courtier
Hugh Hare (MP) (1542–1620), member of parliament for Haslemere